Sun Xiao (born June 13, 1992) is a Chinese field hockey player. She competed for the China women's national field hockey team at the 2016 Summer Olympics.

She won a silver medal as a member of the Chinese team at 2014 Asian Games.

References

1992 births
Living people
Chinese female field hockey players
Asian Games medalists in field hockey
Asian Games silver medalists for China
Field hockey players at the 2014 Asian Games
Field hockey players at the 2016 Summer Olympics
Medalists at the 2014 Asian Games
Olympic field hockey players of China